The Man Hater is a 1917 American silent comedy drama film directed by Albert Parker and starring Winifred Allen,  Jack Meredith and Harry Neville. Future star Ann Dvorak appeared in the film as a child actress.

Cast
 Winifred Allen as 	Phemie Sanders
 Jack Meredith as 	Joe Stull
 Harry Neville as 	Phemie's Father
 Jessie Shirley as Phemie's Mother
 Marguerite Gale as 	Lucy Conyer
 Robert Vivian as 	The Doctor
 Ann Dvorak as 	Phemie's Little Sister

References

Bibliography
 Lombardi, Frederic . Allan Dwan and the Rise and Decline of the Hollywood Studios. McFarland, 2013.

External links
 

1910s American films
1917 films
1917 comedy films
1910s English-language films
American silent feature films
American black-and-white films
Films directed by Albert Parker
Triangle Film Corporation films
Silent American comedy films